Parnamirim Is an upscale neighbourhood of the city of Recife, in Pernambuco, in Brazil.

It locates  in the RPA-3, north zone of Recife. It does limits with the neighbourhoods Casa Amarilla, Casa Fuerte, Tamarineira, Jaqueira, Santana and Pozo of the Panela.

According to data of the Census of the Brazilian Institute of Geography and Statistical, in the 2000, the population of Parnamirim had a monthly half income of 3 666.44, the fourth elder of the city.

In this neighbourhood is located the Temple of the Church Mórmon, with jurisdiction especially the Northeast.

Etymology 
The toponym "Parnamirim" is of tupí origin and means "small sea", through the union of the terms stopã ("sea") and mirim ("small").

Statistics 
 Population: 7 636 inhabitants
 Area: 61.0 hectares
 Density: 88.87 inhabitants by hectare

References

External links 
 Information of Recife (in Portuguese)
 Map of the neighbourhood (in Portuguese)

Neighbourhoods of Recife